The Crime and Justice Research Alliance (abbreviated CJRA) is a Washington, D.C.-based partnership between the Academy of Criminal Justice Sciences and the American Society of Criminology. It was established in 2014, and aims to provide nonpartisan summaries of criminal justice research to policymakers. It represents over 5,000 criminal justice experts.

References

External links

Criminology organizations
Organizations established in 2014
Organizations based in Washington, D.C.
2014 establishments in Washington, D.C.